Todd Reid was the defending champion, but did not complete in the Juniors this year.

Florin Mergea defeated Chris Guccione in the final, 6–2, 7–6(7–3) to win the boys' singles tennis title at the 2003 Wimbledon Championships.

Seeds

  Tomáš Berdych (quarterfinals)
  Brian Baker (quarterfinals)
  Dudi Sela (second round)
  Mathieu Montcourt (second round)
  György Balázs (first round)
  Florin Mergea (champion)
  Jo-Wilfried Tsonga (semifinals)
  Chris Guccione (final)
  Daniel Gimeno Traver (first round)
  Andy Murray (first round)
  Bruno Rosa (first round)
  Chris Kwon (third round)
  Leonardo Kirche (first round)
  Suk Hyun-joon (second round)
  Frederico Gil (third round)
  David Brewer (second round)

Draw

Finals

Top half

Section 1

Section 2

Bottom half

Section 3

Section 4

References

External links

Boys' Singles
Wimbledon Championship by year – Boys' singles